The TKB-09 (ТКБ-09) was a Soviet delayed blowback assault rifle chambered in 5.45×39mm. It used a bolt attached to a spring in a tube above the barrel. The TKB-09 was intended to force the weight forward as means of increasing accuracy. TKB-010 was the variant chambered in 7.62×39mm.

References 

7.62×39mm assault rifles
Delayed blowback firearms
Trial and research firearms of the Soviet Union
Assault rifles of the Soviet Union
Tula Arms Plant products